Persicaria virginiana, also called jumpseed, Virginia knotweed or woodland knotweed is a North American species of smartweed within the buckwheat family. It is unusual as a shade-tolerant member of a mostly sun-loving genus.  Jumpseed is a perennial, named for its seeds which can "jump" several feet when a ripe seedpod is disturbed.

Persicaria virginiana blooms in midsummer to late summer/early fall. It has a stalk of small white flowers.

Description
Like other Persicaria, jumpseed has alternate leaves, with fine-hairy stipular sheaths (ocrea) with bristle-fringed edges which often turn brownish.  Flowers, widely spaced along slender stalks, are white to greenish-white, rarely pink-tinged, and  fruiting flowers have 2 downward-pointing hook-tipped styles.  Persicaria virginiana is easily distinguished from most other Persicaria species by its much larger, more oval-shaped leaves, although a few species also have large leaves.  It sometimes has a chevron-shaped marking on the leaves; often a single plant will have this marking on some leaves but not others.

Cultivars and naturalized populations from cultivation show much greater variation than wild-type plants, sometimes having variegation or have more involved red patterning, and sometimes having red or pink flowers.

Distribution and habitat
Persicaria virginiana has a wide native range throughout most of eastern North America (from Ontario and Quebec, south to Florida, and west as far as Texas, Nebraska, and Minnesota/), as well as Japan and the Himalayas.

It naturally occurs in full to partial shade, on riverbanks, woods, cliffs, and rocks.

Cultivation
Many variegated cultivars exist including 'Variegata' and 'Painter's Palette'. The cultivated plant prefers medium to moist soil and full sun to part shade.

References

External links

photo of herbarium specimen at Missouri Botanical Garden, collected in Missouri in 2014

virginiana
Flora of North America
Plants described in 1753
Taxa named by Carl Linnaeus